René Hell (1891–1965) was a French actor.

Selected filmography
 Special Mission (1946)
 Dilemma of Two Angels (1948)
 After Love (1948)
 Five Red Tulips (1949)
 The Red Angel (1949)
 The Unexpected Voyager (1950)
 Quay of Grenelle (1950)
 Rome Express (1950)
 Mammy (1951)
 Passion (1951)
 Imperial Violets (1952)
 The House on the Dune (1952)
 The Red Head (1952)
 Darling Anatole  (1954)
 Service Entrance (1954)
 The Count of Bragelonne (1954)
 I'll Get Back to Kandara (1956)
 A Bomb for a Dictator (1957)
 And Your Sister? (1958)
 All the Gold in the World  (1961)
 The Gentleman from Epsom (1962)

1891 births
1965 deaths
French male film actors
20th-century French male actors